Tikken Singh is an Indian field hockey player. He competed at the 1986 Asian Games in Seoul, where the Indian team won the bronze medal. He is from the state of Manipur.

References

Living people
Field hockey players from Manipur
Indian male field hockey players
Asian Games medalists in field hockey
Field hockey players at the 1986 Asian Games
Asian Games bronze medalists for India
Medalists at the 1986 Asian Games
Year of birth missing (living people)